William Allan Oldfield (February 4, 1874 – November 19, 1928) was an American lawyer and politician who served as a U.S. Representative from Arkansas from 1909 until his death.

Early life
Born in Franklin, Arkansas, Oldfield was the son of blacksmith Milton Oldfield and his wife, Mary Ann (Matheny) Oldfield. He attended the public schools of Franklin and graduated from Melbourne High School in 1892. He began attendance at Arkansas College in Batesville. He graduated in 1896 and became a school teacher and principal in Richmond, Arkansas, while also studying law.

Military service
In 1898, Oldfield enlisted for the Spanish–American War as a private in Company M, 2nd Arkansas Infantry Regiment. He was promoted to first sergeant before receiving a commission as a first lieutenant, and he was mustered out in March 1899.

Career
After returning home, Oldfield graduated from Cumberland University's law school in Lebanon, Tennessee, in 1900, attained admission to the bar, and commenced practice in Batesville. A Democrat, he was prosecuting attorney of Independence County from 1902 to 1906. In 1906, Oldfield was an unsuccessful candidate for the U.S. House.

Congressman
In 1908, Oldfield won election to the 61st Congress. He was reelected ten times and served from March 4, 1909, until his death. Oldfield was chairman of the Committee on Patents in the 62nd and 63rd Congresses, and Minority Whip from the 67th through 70th Congress. In addition, he served on the Ways and Means Committee and served as chairman of the Democratic Congressional Campaign Committee.

Oldfield won reelection to the 71st Congress in 1928, but died before the term started in March 1929. He was succeeded in Congress by his wife Pearl P. Oldfield.

Death and burial
Oldfield died in Washington, D.C. on November 19, 1928. He was buried at Oak Lawn Cemetery in Batesville.

Family
In 1901, Oldfield married Fannie Pearl Peden. They were married until his death, and had no children.

See also
 List of United States Congress members who died in office (1900–49)

References

Sources

Internet

Books

External links

 
 William Allan Oldfield at The Political Graveyard

1874 births
1928 deaths
Lyon College alumni
Cumberland School of Law alumni
American military personnel of the Spanish–American War
District attorneys in Arkansas
Democratic Party members of the United States House of Representatives from Arkansas
Burials in Arkansas
United States Army officers